Mikkel Gaarder is a paralympic athlete from Norway competing mainly in category T51 track events.

Mikkel competed in various track races at the 2000 Summer Paralympics ranging from the 200m up to the marathon, but it was in the shortest of those events the 200m that he won his only medal a silver.  He returned to the Paralympics in 2004 where he competed in just the two events, the 200m and the marathon but was unable to medal in either.

References

External links
 

Year of birth missing (living people)
Living people
Paralympic athletes of Norway
Paralympic silver medalists for Norway
Paralympic medalists in athletics (track and field)
Athletes (track and field) at the 2000 Summer Paralympics
Athletes (track and field) at the 2004 Summer Paralympics
Medalists at the 2000 Summer Paralympics
Norwegian wheelchair racers
21st-century Norwegian people